Liuzhou Rail Transit is a monorail metro system currently under construction in Liuzhou, Guangxi Zhuang autonomous region, China. Currently Lines 1 and 2 are under construction using monorails manufactured under a JV between Bombardier Transportation and CRRC. It is planned to consist of lines 1, 2, 3 and 4 and suburban lines S1, S2 and S3.

History
Construction of a light railroad had started in Liuzhou in 1928. The railroad opened on March 1, 1933 and had two branches (one via Dongda Road to the Liuzhou Brick Factory and another to the First Division of the National Revolutionary Army) and a total length of 8.3 km. The train used was a small trail that needed manpower to assist. The line was shut down in the early 1950s and the track was demolished.

Timeline
 In December 2016, construction of Line 1 started.
 In 2017, the Ministry of Environmental Protection reviewed and approved the "Environmental Impact Report on Liuzhou Urban Rail Transit Network and Construction Planning".
 In June 2017 the construction of Line 2 started.
 In September 2020, testing on Line 1 began.
In November 2020, the Guangxi Cultural Tourism Development Conference was held in Liuzhou. The Liuzhou Rail Transit was one of the eleven observation points of the conference.

Lines

References

Rapid transit in China
Liuzhou
Monorails in China